Series 6 of La France a un incroyable talent (a French TV show), aired from 19 October to 14 December 2011 on the M6 channel.

Semi-final 1 (23 November)

Semi-final 2 (30 November)

Semi-final 3 (7 December)

France
2011 French television seasons